Ali Labib Gabr (February 14, 1898, Cairo, Egypt — January 19, 1966) was a well known Egyptian architect who practiced during the second quarter of the 20th Century. He was the first Egyptian Dean of the School of Architecture at Cairo University (1946-1955), and is noted for being a leading 'pioneer architect' in designing both workers housing and luxury villas, in particular that of Arab diva Om Kalthoum in the Cairo neighbourhood of Zamalek.

Early life and education
He studied architecture in England at a time when Frank Lloyd Wright was influential and Le Corbusier and Hausmann were still evoked in Paris. Committed to bringing back part of what he had seen, together with Garo Balyan and Max Edrei (designers of the Union Vie Building on Gabalaya Street); and Antoine Selim Nahas (author of Lebon), he was bent on making a difference in Cairo.

He worked between 1920 and 1950.

Buildings
Ali Labib Gabr Bldg, Ibn Zanki Street, Zamalek
Villa Erfan-Liscovitch, Road 85 Maadi
Ali Hussein Bey Ayoub (1940), No. 25 Abu El Feda Street, Zamalek,
Lebanese Embassy in Zamalek (1939) Mansour Mohamed Street,
Yehya Bldg (circa 1951) in Zamalek where composer Abdel Wahab lived
Villa Dr. Mohammed Bey Rida (1932) (as of 1949 Indian Embassy residence), Mohammed Mazhar Street, Zamalek.
remodelled Villa Murro Pasha on Ibn Zanki Street, Zamalek
Possibly the Giza governorate HQ, Pyramids Road.
Indian Embassy residence on Zamalek's Mohammed Mazhar Street. (art-deco style)

One of his iconic buildings on Tahrir Square has been damaged by fire during the 2011 revolution.

References

Egyptian architects
Modernist architects